Paul Janz (born 1951) is a Canadian theologian who was formerly a prominent singer-songwriter of pop rock music in the mainstream and contemporary Christian markets. He is known for such hits as "Every Little Tear", "One Night", "All I Have", "One Last Lie", "Believe In Me", "Go to Pieces", "Rocket to My Heart", "Close My Eyes", "Stand", "Prince Of Pain King Of Fools" and "I Won't Cry".

Career
Janz began his music career in the 1970s with his brother, cousin, and friends in several bands under the names Danny and Paul, Danny Paul and Wayne, the Janz Team Singers and, finally, Deliverance. Brought up in a Mennonite family, he first learned the trumpet and by age 13 was engaged with his local chapter of the Salvation Army. Interested in Gospel music and rock, combined with a broad interest in music saw him record four albums with Deliverance in four years. These were successful in Germany and included 1979's Leaving LA which reached No. 56 on Billboard. In 1984, he launched his solo career, which culminated in four projects with a string of chart-topping hits from each album. The first solo album recorded at Greenhouse Studios in Vancouver would achieve gold record status in Canada. In 1986, Michael Godin, who was vice president of A&R with A&M Records Canada, left to become Janz's manager. The success of his projects led to his nomination for a Juno Award, Canada's most prominent music award. Despite achieving great success in Canada, his U.S. record label's restructuring of its roster of artists led to the end of promotion in the American market. Janz's final project, Trust, which was recorded under a co-partnership with the Attic Records label, continued the same lyrical compositions and melodic rhythms. Since that time, Janz has not released any new material.

In 1981 he took part in the German selection for the Eurovision Song Contest with the song "Steine (Stones)". He finished tenth behind musicians like Taco and Peter Cornelius. Instead, Lena Valaitis was selected to represent Germany at the Eurovision Song Contest 1981 with the song "Johnny Blue". The song has also been recorded in English with his band Deliverance, a longer version titled "Last Road to Forever".

In 1989 Songwriter was released, an album distributed by the publisher, Irving Music of Canada, to promote Janz's songs to other artists and producers, not intended for commercial release.

Prior to retiring, he was the Professor Emeritus of Philosophical Theology and Head of the Department of Theology and Religious Studies at King's College London. He formerly taught philosophy at Trinity Western University in Langley, British Columbia, and has written a book entitled God, the Mind's Desire: Reference, Reason and Christian Thinking published by Cambridge University Press. In 2004, Janz's first album, High Strung, was re-released on CD for the first time by Escape Music in the UK. More recently, he has launched a new brand, Transformation Theology, a remake of Bonhoeffer's grass-root theology.

His son Chris Janz was a recording artist and GMA Canada Covenant Award winning songwriter and Covenant Award-nominated producer. Chris died in Abbotsford, British Columbia on December 14, 2016.

Discography

Studio albums
 High Strung (1985)
 Electricity (1987)
 Renegade Romantic (1990)
 Trust (1992)

Compilation albums
 Presence: A Collection of Hit Singles (1992)

Promotional albums
 Songwriter (1989)

with Deliverance
 To God Be the Glory (1976)
 Give It a Try (1977)
 Lasting Impressions (1978)
 Tightrope (1979)

Singles

"Believe in Me" also reached No. 25 on the U.S. Billboard Adult Contemporary chart in 1987.

Notes

References

External links
 Canconrox – Paul Janz biography
 Blue Desert – Paul Janz discography
 Jam! Pop Encyclopedia entry 
 Professor Emeritus Paul Janz – King's College London biography (copy archived June 10, 2017)

1951 births
Living people
21st-century evangelicals
21st-century theologians
Academics of King's College London
Alumni of the University of Cambridge
Canadian Christian theologians
Canadian emigrants to Switzerland
Canadian expatriate academics in the United Kingdom
Canadian male singer-songwriters
Canadian Mennonites
Canadian performers of Christian music
Canadian philosophers
Canadian rock singers
Evangelical theologians
Juno Award for Breakthrough Artist of the Year winners
Mennonite musicians
Musicians from Alberta
People from Kneehill County
Simon Fraser University alumni
Systematic theologians
Academic staff of Trinity Western University